Zovi Do is a village in the municipality of Nevesinje, Republika Srpska, Bosnia and Herzegovina.

Hollywood actor Brad Dexter's parents are originally from Zovi Do and emigrated to the United States.

References

Populated places in Nevesinje
Villages in Republika Srpska